Jayanagar may refer to:

 Jayanagar, Bihar, a town of the Madhubani district in the Indian state of Bihar.
 Jayanagar, Bangalore, a neighbourhood of the Bangalore district in the Indian state of Karnataka.
 Jayanagar metro station, a metro station of the Bangalore district in the Indian state of Karnataka.
 Jayanagar (Vidhana Sabha constituency), a legislative assembly constituency of the Bangalore district in the Indian state of Karnataka.
 National College, Jayanagar, a college of the Bangalore district in the Indian state of Karnataka.
 Jayanagar, Mysore, a neighbourhood of the Mysore district in the Indian state of Karnataka.
 Jayanagar, Kapilvastu, a town of the Kapilvastu district in the Nepal.
 Jayanagar, Rautahat, a town of the Rautahat district in the Nepal.